New Zealand-born Australian country music singer Keith Urban has released 12 studio albums, four compilation albums, and 55 singles. He began his career in 1991 with the release of his self-titled debut album on EMI and Capitol Records in Australia. After an American album in 1997 as a member of The Ranch, he embarked on a solo career there as well, subsequently releasing five more studio albums. His highest-certified album in the US is 2004's Be Here, which is four-times-platinum.

Of his 48 solo singles, 41 were released to US and Canadian radio. He has scored 20 No. 1 singles on the US Hot Country Songs chart, plus his guest appearance on Brad Paisley's No. 1 single "Start a Band". "Once in a Lifetime" is his highest-debuting single on the US Hot Country Songs chart, entering at No. 17. "You'll Think of Me" and "Making Memories of Us" were also hits on the Adult Contemporary chart, and peaked at No. 2 and No. 5, respectively.

Albums

Studio albums

Compilation albums

Singles

1990s

2000s

2010s

2020s

As featured artist

Other charted songs

Other appearances

Videography

Video albums

Music videos

See also 
 The Ranch

Notes

References 

Country music discographies
Discographies of Australian artists
Discographies of New Zealand artists
Discography